Liu Jiyuan (died in 992), also known by his regnal name Emperor Yingwu of (Northern) Han ((北)漢英武帝), was the last ruler of the Shatuo-led Chinese Northern Han dynasty during the Five Dynasties and Ten Kingdoms period. He was the grandson of Liu Min. He ruled Northern Han from 968 until 979, when he surrendered to Song forces under the Emperor Taizong of Song.

Family 
Parents:
Father: Sir He (何氏)
Mother: Lady Liu (劉氏), daughter of Liu Mi
Wives:
Empress Duan, of the Duan clan  (段皇后 段氏)
Empress Ma, of the Ma clan (馬皇后 馬氏)
Unknown:
Liu Shoujie/Liu Sanzhu (劉守節/劉三豬), first son
Liu Xu (劉續), second son

References

992 deaths
Northern Han emperors
10th-century Turkic people
Year of birth unknown